Roseanna is a 1967 Swedish detective film directed by Hans Abramson. It is based on the 1965 novel Roseanna by Swedish writers Maj Sjöwall and Per Wahlöö about fictional Swedish police detective Martin Beck.

Plot
When a dead and unknown woman is found in a canal, the case arrives on the desk of police inspector Martin Beck. When the woman is identified, the police reconstruct the woman's final day - a trip on the canal boat "Wilhelm Thams".

Cast
Keve Hjelm as Martin Beck
Hans Ernback as Folke Bengtsson
Tor Isedal as Gunnar Ahlberg
Gio Petré as Roseanna McGraw
Kerstin Tidelius as Sonja Hansson
Diane Varsi as Mary Jane Peterson
Michael Tolan as Elmer B. Kafka
Braulio Castillo as Edgar Castillo
Hans Bendrik as Kollberg
Rolf Larsson as Karl-Åke Eriksson-Stolt
Leif Liljeroth as Stenström
Mona Malm as Siv Lundberg
Jan Erik Lindqvist as Melander
Ann-Mari Adamsson as Martin Beck's wife
Monica Strömmerstedt as the woman at the service station

External links

Martin Beck films
1960s Swedish films